Lynn School District was a school district headquartered in Lynn, Arkansas. The district operated Lynn Preschool, Lynn Elementary School, and Lynn High School. The mascot was the lion.

It included Lynn and Smithville.

On July 1, 2004, it merged with the River Valley School District to form the Hillcrest School District.

References

Further reading
  (Download) - Boundary of the Lynn District

External links
 
 

Education in Lawrence County, Arkansas
2004 disestablishments in Arkansas
School districts disestablished in 2004
Defunct school districts in Arkansas